Lincoln Township is one of ten townships in Newton County, Indiana. As of the 2010 census, its population was 4,480 and it contained 1,734 housing units.

History
Lincoln Township was established in 1872.

Geography

Unincorporated towns
 Pembroke at 
 Roselawn at 
 Thayer at 
(This list is based on USGS data and may include former settlements.)

References

External links
 Indiana Township Association
 United Township Association of Indiana

Townships in Newton County, Indiana
Townships in Indiana